Kunle Bamtefa is a Nigerian actor known for playing the role of "Uncle Pablo" in The Johnsons family sitcom and Chief Fuji in Fuji House of Commotion.

Filmography 
Checkmate, 1991
Mortal Inheritance, 1996
Violated, 1996
Saworoide,1999
The Johnsons
Fuji House of Commotion

References 

Living people
Year of birth missing (living people)
Place of birth missing (living people)
20th-century Nigerian male actors
21st-century Nigerian male actors
Nigerian male film actors
Nigerian male television actors